Shameless is an American television comedy-drama series which premiered on Showtime on January 9, 2011. Created by Paul Abbott, the series was developed for American television by John Wells and based upon the British series of the same name. HBO began developing an American version of Shameless after striking a deal with John Wells in January 2009. By October 2009 the development had moved to Showtime. John Wells Productions filmed a pilot episode for the cable network in December 2009.

In January 2020, the series was renewed for an eleventh and final season, which premiered on December 6, 2020. On December 14, 2020, Showtime announced six-episodes in clip show format to air during season 11 called Shameless Hall of Shame with new and original Shameless scenes juxtaposed with a retrospective look at each character's journey during the prior 10 seasons.

Series overview

Episodes

Season 1 (2011)

Season 2 (2012)

Season 3 (2013)

Season 4 (2014)

Season 5 (2015)

Season 6 (2016)

Season 7 (2016)

Season 8 (2017–18)

Season 9 (2018–19)

Season 10 (2019–20)

Season 11 (2020–21)

Specials

Shameless Hall of Shame (2020–21)

Ratings

References

External links

 
 

Lists of American comedy-drama television series episodes
Shameless (American TV series)